Yegor Sergeevich Zhukov (born 28 July 1998) is a Russian radio host, blogger and politician.

Biography
Born on 28 July 1998, Zhukov is a student and tutor at the Higher School of Economics. He prepares his students for subject Olympiads. Zhukov is described as a libertarian.

Created his YouTube blog on June 6, 2017 as part of the contest of Alexei Navalny.

On 14 February 2019, he announced his candidacy for the elections to the Moscow City Duma 2019. On 30 June, he announced the removal of his candidacy.

During the 2019 Moscow protests he became "Moscow's New Face Of Dissent" for his YouTube videos in support of protestors and their cause against corrupt Russian elections and criticizing police actions during rallies. On 2 August 2019, he was arrested and charged with rioting during an unauthorized rally in Moscow.

On 6 December, he was sentenced to three years' probation – lighter than expected – following widespread public support for him. Before sentencing he made a statement about responsibility and love in Russian society, contrasting these ideals with the Russian government's autocracy and dehumanization of its citizens. Rapper Oxxxymiron offered to pay his bail.

After his release, Zhukov gained a job as a radio host on the Echo of Moscow radio station. He interviews such Russian figures as Alexey Navalny, Vladimir Zhirinovsky, Natalya Poklonskaya, Leonid Parfyonov, Mikhail Svetov, Maxim Katz and others.

On 30 August 2020, Zhukov was beaten up and taken to a hospital. Zhukov and his attorney linked the assault with his political activity.

For the last 2 years, Yegor Zhukov has not appeared in public, his social networks are not updated.

References 

1998 births
Living people
Russian political activists
Mass media people from Moscow
Echo of Moscow radio presenters
Russian YouTubers
Russian radio personalities
Russian libertarians